Peter Kelly (born 28 April 1942) is an Australian cricketer. He played twenty-three first-class matches for New South Wales and Western Australia between 1962/63 and 1966/67.

See also
 List of New South Wales representative cricketers
 List of Western Australia first-class cricketers

References

External links
 

1942 births
Living people
Australian cricketers
New South Wales cricketers
Western Australia cricketers
Cricketers from Sydney